Dosi may refer to:
 Dosi, a traditional Sri Lankan fruit confectionery
 Giovanni Dosi
 Dushi District
 A slang word for an Orthodox Jew